Hans Keller (unknown — unknown) was an Austrian chess player.

Biography
From the early 1940s to the early 1950s, Hans Keller was one of Austria's leading chess players. He won Vienna city chess championship. He participated in the international chess tournaments: Leopold Trebitsch Memorial Tournament (Vienna 1936), Vienna (1939), Carl Schlechter Memorial Tournament (Vienna 1947), Reggio Emilia (1951).

Hans Keller played for Austria in the Chess Olympiad:
 In 1952, at second reserve board in the 10th Chess Olympiad in Helsinki (+2, =2, -3).

References

External links

Hans Keller chess games at 365chess.com

Year of birth missing
Year of death missing
Austrian chess players
Chess Olympiad competitors
20th-century chess players